The Turkish Women's Volleyball League officially called the Sultans League (Turkish: Sultanlar Ligi), is the highest professional women's volleyball league in Turkey. It is run by the Turkish Volleyball Federation and began with the 1984–85 season. 14 clubs are currently participating in the league. It is often regarded as the best professional women's volleyball league in the world. Its clubs have obtained significant successes in European and other international competitions. Eczacıbaşı are the most successful club, having won 16 championships so far.

It succeeded the former Turkish Women's Volleyball Championship (1956–1984).

2020–21 season

Title holders 

Source:

Performance by club

MVP by Edition 
 2007–08 – 
 2008–09 – 
 2009–10 – 
 2010–11 – 
 2011–12 – 
 2012–13 – 
 2013–14 – 
 2014–15 – 
 2015–16 – 
 2016–17 – 
 2017–18 – 
 2018–19 – 
 2019–20 – cancelled
 2020–21 – 
 2021–22 –

All-time team records 
Summary by team since 1977/1978

Podiums by city since 1977/1978

Various statistics since 2009/2010

(Based on W=2 pts and D=1 pts)

See also 
 Men's
Turkish Men's Volleyball League
Turkish Men's Volleyball Cup
Turkish Men's Volleyball Super Cup
 Women's
Turkish Women's Volleyball League
Turkish Women's Volleyball Cup
Turkish Women's Volleyball Super Cup

External links 
 
 Turkish Volleyball Federation
  Türkiye Kadınlar. women.volleybox.net

References 

Turkey
Women's
Women's volleyball in Turkey
Volleyball
Turkey
Volleyball
Professional sports leagues in Turkey
Turkish Women's Volleyball League